The king cobra (Ophiophagus hannah) is a venomous snake endemic to Asia. Coloration of this species varies across habitats, from black with white stripes to unbroken brownish grey. The sole member of the genus Ophiophagus, it is not taxonomically a true cobra despite its common name. The king cobra inhabits forests from South to Southeastern Asia where it preys chiefly on other snakes, including those of its kind. A female king cobra builds a nest to hold its eggs which will be protected throughout the incubation period.

Resembling a true cobra, the threat display of this elapid includes spreading its neck-flap, raising its head upright, making eye contact, puffing, hissing and occasionally charging. Despite its fearsome reputation, it avoids confrontation with humans whenever possible. Altercations usually only arise from a cobra inadvertently exposing itself or being chased; if, however, provoked or cornered, it is capable of striking long in range and high in position. Bites from this species could involve a large quantity of medically significant neurotoxic venom which may lead to a rapid fatality unless antivenom is administrated in time.

Threatened by habitat destruction, it has been listed as Vulnerable on the IUCN Red List since 2010. Regarded as the national reptile of India, it has an eminent position in the mythology and folk traditions of India, Bangladesh, Sri Lanka and Myanmar.

Taxonomy 
The king cobra is also referred to by the common name "hamadryad", especially in older literature. Hamadryas hannah was the scientific name used by Danish naturalist Theodore Edward Cantor in 1836 who described four king cobra specimens, three captured in the Sundarbans and one in the vicinity of Kolkata.
Naja bungarus was proposed by Hermann Schlegel in 1837 who described a king cobra zoological specimen from Java. 
In 1838, Cantor proposed the name Hamadryas ophiophagus for the king cobra and explained that it has dental features intermediate between the genera Naja and Bungarus.
Naia vittata proposed by Walter Elliot in 1840 was a king cobra caught offshore near Chennai that was floating in a basket.
Hamadryas elaps proposed by Albert Günther in 1858 were king cobra specimens from the Philippines and Borneo. Günther considered both N. bungarus and N. vittata a variety of H. elaps.
The genus Ophiophagus was proposed by Günther in 1864. The name is derived from its propensity to eat snakes.

Naja ingens proposed by Alexander Willem Michiel van Hasselt in 1882 was a king cobra captured near Tebing Tinggi in northern Sumatra.

Ophiophagus hannah was accepted as the valid name for the king cobra by Charles Mitchill Bogert in 1945 who argued that it differs significantly from Naja species.
A genetic analysis using cytochrome b, and a multigene analysis showed that the king cobra was an early offshoot of a genetic lineage giving rise to the mambas, rather than the Naja cobras.

A phylogenetic analysis of mitochondrial DNA showed that specimens from Surattani and Nakhon Si Thammarat Provinces in southern Thailand form a deeply divergent clade from those from northern Thailand, which grouped with specimens from Myanmar and Guangdong in southern China.

Description 

The king cobra's skin is olive green with black and white bands on the trunk that converge to the head. The head is covered by 15 drab coloured and black edged shields. The muzzle is rounded, and the tongue black. It has two fangs and 3–5 maxillar teeth in the upper jaw, and two rows of teeth in the lower jaw. The nostrils are between two shields. The large eyes have a golden iris and round pupils. Its hood is oval shaped and covered with olive green smooth scales and two black spots between the two lowest scales. Its cylindrical tail is yellowish green above and marked with black.
It has a pair of large occipital scales on top of the head, 17 to 19 rows of smooth oblique scales on the neck, and 15 rows on the body. Juveniles are black with chevron shaped white, yellow or buff bars that point towards the head.
The longest known individual measured . Ventral scales are uniformly oval shaped. Dorsal scales are placed in an oblique arrangement.

The king cobra is sexually dimorphic, with males being larger and paler in particular during the breeding season.
It differs from other cobra species by size and hood. It is larger, has a narrower and longer stripe on the neck.

Distribution and habitat 
The king cobra has a wide distribution in South and Southeast Asia.

In northern India, it has been recorded in Garhwal and Kumaon, and in the Shivalik and terai regions of Uttarakhand and Uttar Pradesh. In northeast India, the king cobra has been recorded in northern West Bengal, Sikkim, Assam, Meghalaya, Arunachal Pradesh, Nagaland, Manipur and Mizoram.
In the Eastern Ghats, it occurs from Tamil Nadu and Andhra Pradesh to coastal Odisha, and also in Bihar and southern West Bengal, especially the Sundarbans. In the Western Ghats, it was recorded in Kerala, Karnataka and Maharashtra, and also in Gujarat. It also occurs on Baratang Island in the Great Andaman chain.

Behaviour and ecology

Like other snakes, a king cobra receives chemical information via its forked tongue, which picks up scent particles and transfers them to a sensory receptor (Jacobson's organ) located in the roof of its mouth. When it detects the scent of prey, it flicks its tongue to gauge the prey's location, with the twin forks of the tongue acting in stereo.

Following envenomation, it swallows its prey whole. Because of its flexible jaws, it can swallow prey much larger than its head. It is considered diurnal because it hunts during the day, but has also been seen at night, rarely.

Diet 

The king cobra is an apex predator and dominant over all other snakes except large pythons. Its diet consists primarily of other snakes and lizards, including Indian cobra, banded krait, rat snake, pythons, green whip snake, keelback, banded wolf snake and Blyth's reticulated snake.
It also hunts Malabar pit viper and hump-nosed pit viper by following their odour trails. In Singapore, one was observed swallowing a clouded monitor.
When food is scarce, it also feeds on other small vertebrates, such as birds, and lizards. In some cases, the cobra constricts its prey using its muscular body, though this is uncommon. After a large meal, it lives for many months without another one because of its slow metabolic rate.

Defense 

The king cobra is not considered aggressive. It usually avoids humans and slinks off when disturbed, but is known to aggressively defend incubating eggs and attack intruders rapidly. When alarmed, it raises the front part of its body, extends the hood, shows the fangs and hisses loudly.
Wild king cobras encountered in Singapore appeared to be placid, but reared up and struck in self defense when cornered.

The king cobra possesses a potent neurotoxic venom and death can occur in as little as 30 minutes after being bitten. Most victims bitten by king cobras are snake charmers. Hospital records in Thailand indicate that bites from king cobras are very uncommon.

The king cobra can be easily irritated by closely approaching objects or sudden movements. When raising its body, the king cobra can still move forward to strike with a long distance, and people may misjudge the safe zone. It can deliver multiple bites in a single attack.

Growling hiss 
The hiss of the king cobra is a much lower pitch than many other snakes and many people thus liken its call to a "growl" rather than a hiss. While the hisses of most snakes are of a broad-frequency span ranging from roughly 3,000 to 13,000 Hz with a dominant frequency near 7,500 Hz, king cobra growls consist solely of frequencies below 2,500 Hz, with a dominant frequency near 600 Hz, a much lower-sounding frequency closer to that of a human voice. Comparative anatomical morphometric analysis has led to a discovery of tracheal diverticula that function as low-frequency resonating chambers in king cobra and its prey, the rat snake, both of which can make similar growls.

Reproduction 

The female is gravid for 50 to 59 days.
The king cobra is the only snake that builds a nest using dry leaf litter, starting from late March to late May. They consist of several layers and have mostly one chamber, into which the female lays eggs.
Clutch size ranges from 7 to 43 eggs, with 6 to 38 eggs hatching after incubation periods of 66 to 105 days. Females stay by their nests between two and 77 days.

The venom of hatchlings is as potent as that of the adults. They may be brightly marked, but these colours often fade as they mature. They are alert and nervous, being highly aggressive if disturbed.

The average lifespan of a wild king cobra is about 20 years.

Venom 

The king cobra's venom consists of cytotoxins and neurotoxins, including alpha-neurotoxins and three-finger toxins. Other components have cardiotoxic effects. Its venom is produced in anatomical glands named postorbital venom glands.

It can deliver up to 420 mg venom in dry weight (400–600 mg overall) per bite, with a  toxicity in mice of 1.28 mg/kg through intravenous injection, 1.5 to 1.7 mg/kg through subcutaneous injection,
and 1.644 mg/kg through intraperitoneal injection. For research purposes, up to 1 g of venom was obtained through milking.

The toxins affect the victim's central nervous system, resulting in severe pain, blurred vision, vertigo, drowsiness, and eventually paralysis. If the envenomation is serious, it progresses to cardiovascular collapse, and the victim falls into a coma. Death soon follows due to respiratory failure. The affected person can die within 30 minutes of envenomation. Ohanin, a protein component of the venom, causes hypolocomotion and hyperalgesia in mammals. Large quantities of antivenom may be needed to reverse the progression of symptoms.

Polyvalent antivenom of equine origin is produced by Haffkine Institute and King Institute of Preventive Medicine and Research in India.
A polyvalent antivenom produced by the Thai Red Cross Society can effectively neutralize venom of the king cobra. In Thailand, a concoction of turmeric root has been clinically shown to create a strong resilience against the venom of the king cobra when ingested. Proper and immediate treatments are critical to avoid death. Successful precedents include a client who recovered and was discharged in 10 days after being treated by accurate antivenom and inpatient care.

Not all king cobra bites result in envenomation, but they are often considered for medical importance. Clinical mortality rates vary between different regions and depend on many factors, such as local medical advancement. A Thai survey reports 10 deaths out of 35 patients received for king cobra bites, whose fatality rate posed (28%) is higher than those of other cobra species. The Department of Clinical Toxinology of the University of Adelaide gives this serpent a general untreated fatality rate of 50–60%, implying that the snake has about a half chance to deliver bites involving nonfatal quantities of venom.

Threats 
In Southeast Asia, the king cobra is threatened foremost by habitat destruction owing to deforestation and expansion of agricultural land. It is also threatened by poaching for its meat, skin and for use in traditional Chinese medicine.

Conservation 
The king cobra is listed in CITES Appendix II. It is protected in China and Vietnam. 
In India, it is placed under Schedule II of Wildlife Protection Act, 1972. Killing a king cobra is punished with imprisonment of up to six years.

Cultural significance 
The king cobra has an eminent position in the mythology and folklore of India, Bangladesh, Sri Lanka and Myanmar.
A ritual in Myanmar involves a king cobra and a female snake charmer. The charmer is a priestess who is usually tattooed with three pictograms and kisses the snake on the top of its head at the end of the ritual. 
Members of the Pakokku clan tattoo themselves with ink mixed with cobra venom on their upper bodies in a weekly inoculation that they believe would protect them from the snake, though no scientific evidence supports this.

It is regarded as the national reptile of India.

References

External links 

 Ophiophagus hannah Research and Information

Apex predators
Elapidae
Reptiles of Borneo
National symbols of India
Reptiles described in 1836
Reptiles of Bangladesh
Reptiles of Bhutan
Reptiles of Brunei
Reptiles of Cambodia
Reptiles of Hong Kong
Reptiles of India
Reptiles of Laos
Reptiles of Nepal
Reptiles of the Philippines
Snakes of China
Snakes of Indonesia
Snakes of Malaysia
Snakes of Myanmar
Snakes of Thailand
Snakes of Vietnam
Taxa named by Theodore Edward Cantor